Discography of French space rock band, Rockets.

Albums

Studio albums
 Rockets (1976)
 On the Road Again (1978)
 Sound of the Future (1979)
 Plasteroïd (1979)
 Galaxy (1980)
 π 3,14 (1981)
 Atomic (1982)
 Imperception (1984)
 One Way (1986)
 Another Future (1992)
 Don't Stop (2003)
 Kaos (2014)
 Alienation (2021)

Live albums
 Live (1980)

Compilation albums
 Galactica (1982)
 Greatest Hits (1996)
 Hits & Remixes (1996)
 The Definitive Collection (2000)
 Original Greatest Hits (2003)
 Rocket Fuel (2005)
 The Silver Years (7 albums, digitally remastered) (2007)
 A Long Journey (2009)

Singles
"Rocket Man"
"Future Woman"
"Samurai"
"Space Rock"
"Fils du Ciel"
"On the Road Again"
"Electric Delight"
"Astral World"
"Galactica"
"Synthetic Man"
"Ideomatic"
"Radiate"
"Radio Station"
"Under the Sun"
"Don't Give Up"

Discographies of French artists